Harry Carlton Good (January 7, 1902 – January 23, 1997) was an American football, basketball and baseball coach at the University of Indianapolis (then known as Indiana Central College) from 1927 to 1943 and later served as the men's basketball coach at Indiana University (1943–1946) and the University of Nebraska (1946–1954).

Playing career
Good was a 1925 graduate of Indiana Central College, where he earned 14 letters in basketball, football, baseball, track, and tennis.

Coaching career
Good served a variety of head coaching roles at his alma mater as well as athletic director from 1927 to 1943.

In 1943, Good became the head basketball coach at Indiana University while Hall of Fame coach Branch McCracken served in the United States Navy during World War II.

Good served as the head coach for the Nebraska Cornhuskers men's basketball team for eight seasons (1946–47 to 1953–54), leading the team to back-to-back Big 7 Conference championships in 1948–49 and 1949–50. To date, these remain the last Husker teams to win a conference regular season basketball title.

Head coaching record

Football

Basketball

References

1902 births
1997 deaths
Indianapolis Greyhounds athletic directors
Indianapolis Greyhounds baseball coaches
Indianapolis Greyhounds baseball players
Indianapolis Greyhounds football coaches
Indianapolis Greyhounds football players
Indianapolis Greyhounds men's basketball coaches
Indianapolis Greyhounds men's basketball players
Indiana Hoosiers men's basketball coaches
Nebraska Cornhuskers men's basketball coaches
College men's tennis players in the United States
College men's track and field athletes in the United States
American men's basketball players